The 2010 CollegeInsider.com Postseason Tournament (CIT) was a postseason single-elimination tournament of 16 National Collegiate Athletic Association (NCAA) Division I teams.

Fifteen of the selected teams were from a pool that are not invited to the 2010 NCAA Men's Division I Basketball Tournament or the 2010 National Invitation Tournament. The 16th team was South Dakota, the champion of the 2010 Great West Conference men's basketball tournament.

The tournament began with first-round games March 16–18, 2010.  Quarterfinal action continued on campus sites on March 22, and the tournament concluded with the championship game on March 30.  The Appalachian State Pacific game was scheduled for Thursday, March 25, due to Pacific being snowed in at the airport after the Northern Colorado game.

Participating teams
The following teams received an invitation to the 2010 CIT:

Bracket
Bracket is for visual purposes only. The CIT does not have a set bracket.

Home teams listed second.
* Denotes overtime period.

References

CollegeInsider.com Postseason Tournament
CollegeInsider.com Tournament